Thomas or Tom Kennedy may refer to:

Politics 
Thomas Kennedy (Scottish judge) (1673–1754), joint Solicitor General for Scotland 1709–14, Lord Advocate 1714, Member of Parliament for Ayr Burghs 1720–21
Thomas Kennedy, 9th Earl of Cassilis (bef. 1733–1775), Scottish peer, Marquess of Ailsa
Thomas Kennedy (1776–1832), politician in Maryland, United States
Thomas Francis Kennedy (1788–1879), Scottish Member of Parliament for Ayr Burghs 1818–1834
Thomas Daniel Kennedy (1849?–1877), Connecticut state legislator
Thomas Kennedy (Australian politician) (1860–1929), Australian politician
Tom Kennedy (British politician) (1874–1954), Scottish Member of Parliament for Kirkcaldy Burghs
Thomas Laird Kennedy (1878–1959), politician in Ontario, Canada
Thomas Kennedy (unionist) (1887–1963), American miner, president of the UMWA 1960–1963, Lieutenant Governor of Pennsylvania 1935–1939
Thomas Kennedy (Irish politician) (died 1947), Irish Labour Party politician and trade union official
Thomas P. Kennedy (1951–2015), American politician, Massachusetts state senator
Thomas Blake Kennedy (1874–1957), United States federal judge

Entertainment 
Thomas E. Kennedy (born 1944), American fiction writer, essayist and translator
Tom Kennedy (actor) (1885–1965), American actor
Tom Kennedy (television host) (1927–2020), American television game show host
Tom Kennedy (producer) (c. 1948–2011), American film trailer producer, director and film editor
Tom Kennedy (musician) (born 1960), jazz double-bass and electric bass player
Tom Kennedy (Neighbours), a character on the Australian soap opera Neighbours, played by Bob Hornery

Sports
Tom Kennedy (Australian footballer) (1906–1968), Australian rules footballer
Tom Kennedy (wheelchair rugby) (born 1957), Australian Paralympic wheelchair rugby player
Tom Kennedy (English footballer) (born 1985), English footballer
Thomas J. Kennedy (1884–1937), American Olympic marathon runner
Thomas Kennedy (basketball) (born 1987), American basketball player
Tom Kennedy (quarterback) (1939–2006), American football quarterback
Tom Kennedy (wide receiver) (born 1996), American football wide receiver

Others 
Tom Kennedy (journalist) (born 1952), Canadian journalist
Thomas Kennedy (unionist) (1887–1963), president of the United Mine workers 
Thomas Fortescue Kennedy (1774–1846), Royal Navy officer
Thomas Kennedy (RAF officer) (1928–2013), British pilot
Thomas Kennedy (violin maker) (1784–1870), British luthier
Thomas A. Kennedy (born 1955), American CEO and chairman, Raytheon Company
Thomas Francis Kennedy (bishop) (1858–1917), bishop of the Catholic Church in the United States

See also
Thomas L. Kennedy Secondary School (established 1953), high school in Mississauga, Ontario, Canada